Irene Camber or Irene Camber-Corno (born 12 February 1926) is an Italian fencer and Olympic champion in foil competition.

Biography
Camber was born in Trieste, Italy on 12 February 1926.  She began to be interested in fencing at eight years-old in Trieste. Her involvement in fencing was not planned, but random. Instead of entering the hall where she used to practice gymnastics, she mistakenly entered the fencing hall. She had four appearances at Olympic Games: London (1948), Helsinki (1952), Rome (1960) and Tokyo (1964). After graduating with a bachelor of science degree in industrial chemistry, she made her debut at the London Games in 1948. She was defeated in the semi-finals. Four years later at the Helsinki Games, she faced two-fold Olympic champion (at Berlin and London Games) 45-year-old Hungarian Ilona Elek. Camber won the match by 4–3. She did not appear at the Melbourne Games, since she was pregnant. At the Rome Games in 1960, she won a bronze team medal. She lastly took part in the Italian fencing team at the Tokyo Games. Camber also won medals st the world fencing championships. Then she began to serve as the national team coach at the Munich Games, and Antonella Ragno, her pupil, won the gold medal. Camber also worked at Montedison chemical corporation during her fencing career.

Achievements
Camber received a gold medal in the individual foil at the 1952 Summer Olympics in Helsinki. At the 1960 Summer Olympics in Rome she received a bronze medal in foil team. She also earned two titles – one individually (1953) and one with the Italian team (1957) – and six more medals at the Fencing World Championships.

See also
 Legends of Italian sport - Walk of Fame
Italian sportswomen multiple medalists at Olympics and World Championships

References

External links
 

1926 births
Living people
Italian female fencers
Olympic fencers of Italy
Fencers at the 1948 Summer Olympics
Fencers at the 1952 Summer Olympics
Fencers at the 1960 Summer Olympics
Fencers at the 1964 Summer Olympics
Olympic gold medalists for Italy
Olympic bronze medalists for Italy
Olympic medalists in fencing
Medalists at the 1952 Summer Olympics
Medalists at the 1960 Summer Olympics
Sportspeople from Trieste